The 1999–2000 NCAA Division I men's ice hockey season began on October 1, 1999, and concluded with the 2000 NCAA Division I Men's Ice Hockey Tournament's championship game on April 8, 2000, at the Providence Civic Center in Providence, Rhode Island. This was the 53rd season in which an NCAA ice hockey championship was held and is the 106th year overall where an NCAA school fielded a team.

The 1999–2000 season was the inaugural year for College Hockey America, a seven-team conference (Wayne State begins conference play the following year) that was created for the purpose of stabilizing all the remaining independent Division I ice hockey teams.

The University of Vermont cancelled the remainder of their season on January 14, 2000, as a result of a criminal investigation into hazing practices when it was revealed that players had lied to investigators.

Pre-season polls

The top 10 from USCHO.com Division I Men's Poll

Regular season

Season tournaments

Standings

2000 NCAA Tournament

Note: * denotes overtime period(s)

Player stats

Scoring leaders
The following players led the league in points at the conclusion of the season.

  
GP = Games played; G = Goals; A = Assists; Pts = Points; PIM = Penalty minutes

Leading goaltenders
The following goaltenders led the league in goals against average at the end of the regular season while playing at least 33% of their team's total minutes.

GP = Games played; Min = Minutes played; W = Wins; L = Losses; OT = Overtime/shootout losses; GA = Goals against; SO = Shutouts; SV% = Save percentage; GAA = Goals against average

Awards

NCAA

CCHA

CHA

ECAC

Hockey East

MAAC

WCHA

See also
 1999–2000 NCAA Division III men's ice hockey season

References

External links
USCHO.com 
College Hockey Historical Archives
College Hockey Stats.net

 
NCAA